Chinese traditional religion is polytheistic; many deities are worshipped in a pantheistic view where divinity is inherent in the world. The gods are energies or principles revealing, imitating and propagating the way of Heaven (Tian ), which is the supreme godhead manifesting in the northern culmen of the starry vault of the skies and its order. Many gods are ancestors or men who became deities for their heavenly achievements; most gods are also identified with stars and constellations. Ancestors are regarded as the equivalent of Heaven within human society, and therefore as the means connecting back to Heaven, which is the "utmost ancestral father" ( zēngzǔfù).

Gods are innumerable, as every phenomenon has or is one or more gods, and they are organised in a complex celestial hierarchy. Besides the traditional worship of these entities, Confucianism, Taoism and formal thinkers in general give theological interpretations affirming a monistic essence of divinity. "Polytheism" and "monotheism" are categories derived from Western religion and do not fit Chinese religion, which has never conceived the two things as opposites. Since all gods are considered manifestations of  qì, the "power" or pneuma of Heaven, some scholars have employed the term "polypneumatism" or "(poly)pneumatolatry", first coined by Walter Medhurst (1796–1857), to describe the practice of Chinese polytheism. In the theology of the classic texts and Confucianism, "Heaven is the lord of the hundreds of deities". Modern Confucian theology compares them to intelligence, substantial forms or entelechies (inner purposes) as explained by Leibniz, generating all types of beings, so that "even mountains and rivers are worshipped as something capable of enjoying sacrificial offerings".

Unlike in Hinduism, the deification of historical persons and ancestors is not traditionally the duty of Confucians or Taoists. Rather depends on the choices of common people; persons are deified when they have made extraordinary deeds and have left an efficacious legacy. Yet, Confucians and Taoists traditionally may demand that state honour be granted to a particular deity. Each deity has a cult centre and ancestral temple where he or she, or the parents, lived their mortal life. There are frequently disputes over which is the original place and source temple of the cult of a deity.

God of Heaven

Chinese traditional theology, which comes in different interpretations according to the classic texts, and specifically Confucian, Taoist and other philosophical formulations, is fundamentally monistic, that is to say it sees the world and the gods who produce it as an organic whole, or cosmos. The universal principle that gives origin to the world is conceived as transcendent and immanent to creation, at the same time. The Chinese idea of the universal God is expressed in different ways; there are many names of God from the different sources of Chinese tradition.

The radical Chinese terms for the universal God are Tiān  and Shàngdì  (the "Highest Deity") or simply Dì  ("Deity"). There is also the concept of Tàidì  (the "Great Deity"). Dì is a title expressing dominance over the all-under-Heaven, that is all things generated by Heaven and ordered by its cycles and by the stars. Tiān is usually translated as "Heaven", but by graphical etymology it means "Great One" and a number of scholars relate it to the same Dì through phonetic etymology and trace their common root, through their archaic forms respectively *Teeŋ and *Tees, to the symbols of the squared north celestial pole godhead (Dīng ). These names are combined in different ways in Chinese theological literature, often interchanged in the same paragraph if not in the same sentence.

Names of the God of Heaven
Besides Shangdi and Taidi, other names include Yudi ("Jade Deity") and Taiyi ("Great Oneness") who, in mythical imagery, holds the ladle of the Big Dipper (Great Chariot) providing the movement of life to the world. As the hub of the skies, the north celestial pole constellations are known, among various names, as Tiānmén  ("Gate of Heaven") and Tiānshū  ("Pivot of Heaven").

Other names of the God of Heaven are attested in the vast Chinese religio-philosophical literary tradition:
 Tiāndì —the "Deity of Heaven" or "Emperor of Heaven": "On Rectification" (Zheng lun) of the Xunzi uses this term to refer to the active God of Heaven setting in motion creation;
 Tiānzhǔ —the "Lord of Heaven": In "The Document of Offering Sacrifices to Heaven and Earth on the Mountain Tai" (Fengshan shu) of the Records of the Grand Historian it is used as the title of the first God from whom all the other gods derive.
 Tiānhuáng —the "August Personage of Heaven": In the "Poem of Fathoming Profundity" (Si'xuan fu), transcribed in "The History of the Later Han Dynasty" (Hou Han shu), Zhang Heng ornately writes: «I ask the superintendent of the Heavenly Gate to open the door and let me visit the King of Heaven at the Jade Palace»;
 Tiānwáng —the "King of Heaven" or "Monarch of Heaven".
 Tiāngōng —the "Duke of Heaven" or "General of Heaven";
 Tiānjūn —the "Prince of Heaven" or "Lord of Heaven";
 Tiānzūn —the "Heavenly Venerable", also a title for high gods in Taoist theologies;
 Tiānshén —the "God of Heaven", interpreted in the Shuowen Jiezi as "the being that gives birth to all things";
 Shénhuáng —"God the August", attested in Taihong ("The Origin of Vital Breath");
 Lǎotiānyé—the "Olden Heavenly Father".

Tian is both transcendent and immanent, manifesting in the three forms of dominance, destiny and nature of things. In the Wujing yiyi ("Different Meanings in the Five Classics"), Xu Shen explains that the designation of Heaven is quintuple:
 Huáng Tiān  —"August Heaven" or "Imperial Heaven", when it is venerated as the lord of creation;
 Hào Tiān —"Vast Heaven", with regard to the vastness of its vital breath (qi);
 Mín Tiān —"Compassionate Heaven", for it hears and corresponds with justice to the all-under-Heaven;
 Shàng Tiān —"Highest Heaven" or "First Heaven", for it is the primordial being supervising all-under-Heaven;
 Cāng Tiān —"Deep-Green Heaven", for it being unfathomably deep.

All these designations reflect a hierarchical, multiperspective experience of divinity.

Lists of gods, deities and immortals

Many classical books have lists and hierarchies of gods and immortals, among which the "Completed Record of Deities and Immortals" (Shénxiān Tōngjiàn) of the Ming dynasty, and the Biographies of the Deities and Immortals or Shenxian Zhuan by Ge Hong (284–343). There's also the older Collected Biographies of the Immortals or Liexian Zhuan. Couplets or polarities, such as Fuxi and Nuwa, Xiwangmu and Dongwanggong, and the highest couple of Heaven and Earth, all embody yin and yang and are at once the originators and maintainers of the ordering process of space and time.

Cosmic gods
 Yudi ( "Jade Deity") or Yuhuang ( "Jade Emperor" or "Jade King"), is the popular human-like representation of the God of Heaven. Jade traditionally represents purity, so it is a metaphor for the unfathomable source of creation.
 Doumu ( "Mother of the Great Chariot"), often entitled with the honorific Tianhou ( "Queen of Heaven") is the heavenly goddess portrayed as the mother of the Big Dipper (Great Chariot), whose seven stars in addition to two invisible ones are conceived as her sons, the Jiuhuangshen ( "Nine God-Kings"), themselves regarded as the ninefold manifestation of Jiuhuangdadi ("Great Deity of the Nine Kings") or Doufu  "Father of the Great Chariot"), another name of the God of Heaven. She is therefore both wife and mother of the God of Heaven.
 Pangu, a macranthropic metaphor of the cosmos. He separated yin and yang, creating the earth (murky yin) and the sky (clear yang). All things were made from his body after he died.
 Xiwangmu ( "Queen Mother of the West"), identified with the Kunlun Mountain, shamanic inspiration, death and immortality. She is the dark, chthonic goddess, pure yin, at the same time terrifying and benign, both creation and destruction, associated with the tiger and weaving. Her male counterpart is Dongwanggong ( "King Duke of the East"; also called Mugong, 木公 "Duke of the Woods"), who represents the yang principle.
 Yi the Archer (Hòuyì ) was a man who sought for immortality reaching Xiwangmu on her mountain Kunlun.
 Yanwang ( "Purgatory King") the ruler of the underworld, assisted by the Heibai Wuchang ( "Black and White Impermanence") representing the alternation of yin and yang principles, alongside Ox-Head and Horse-Face, who escort spirits to his realm.
 Yinyanggong ( "Yinyang Duke") or Yinyangsi ( "Yinyang Controller"), the personification of the union of yin and yang.

Three Patrons and Five Deities

  Sānhuáng — Three Patrons (or Augusts) or  Sāncái — Three Potencies; they are the "vertical" manifestation of Heaven spatially corresponding to the Three Realms ( Sānjiè), representing the yin and yang and the medium between them, that is the human being:
  Fúxī the patron of heaven ( Tiānhuáng), also called Bāguàzǔshī ( "Venerable Inventor of the Bagua") by the Taoists, is a divine man reputed to have taught to humanity writing, fishing, and hunting.
  Nǚwā the patron of earth ( Dehuáng), is a goddess attributed for the creation of mankind and mending the order of the world when it was broken.
  Shénnóng — Peasant God, the patron of humanity ( Rénhuáng), identified as Yándì ( "Flame Deity" or "Fiery Deity"), a divine man said to have taught the techniques of farming, herbal medicine and marketing. He is often represented as a human with horns and other features of an ox.
  Wǔdì — Five Deities, also Wǔfāng Shàngdì ( "Five Manifestations of the Highest Deity"), Wǔfāng Tiānshén ( "Five Manifestations of the Heavenly God"), Wǔfāngdì ( "Five Forms Deity"), Wǔtiāndì ( "Five Heavenly Deities"), Wǔlǎojūn ( "Five Ancient Lords"), Wǔdàoshén ( "Five Ways God(s)"); they are the five main "horizontal" manifestations of Heaven and according with the Three Potencies they have a celestial, a terrestrial and a chthonic form. They correspond to the five phases of creation, the five constellations rotating around the celestial pole and five planets, the five sacred mountains and five directions of space (their terrestrial form), and the five Dragon Gods which represent their mounts, that is to say the material forces they preside over (their chthonic form).
  Huángdì — Yellow Emperor or Yellow Deity; or  Huángshén — Yellow God, also known as Xuānyuán Huángdì ( "Yellow Deity of the Chariot Shaft"), is the Zhōngyuèdàdì ( "Great Deity of the Central Peak"): he represents the essence of earth and the Yellow Dragon, and is associated with Saturn. The character  huáng, for "yellow", also means, by homophony and shared etymology with  huáng, "august", "creator" and "radiant", identifying the Yellow Emperor with Shangdi (the "Highest Deity"). Huangdi represents the heart of creation, the axis mundi (Kunlun) that is the manifestation of the divine order in physical reality, opening the way to immortality. As the deity of the centre, intersecting the Three Patrons and the Five Deities, in the Shizi he is described as "Yellow Emperor with Four Faces" ( Huángdì Sìmiàn). As a human, he is said to have been the fruit of a virginal birth, as his mother Fubao conceived him as she was aroused, while walking in the country, by a lightning from the Big Dipper (Great Chariot). She delivered her son after twenty-four months on the mount of Shou (Longevity) or mount Xuanyuan (Chariot Shaft), after which he was named. He is reputed to be the founder of the Huaxia civilisation, and the Han Chinese identify themselves as the descendants of Yandi and Huangdi.
  Cāngdì — Green Deity; or  Qīngdì — Blue Deity or Bluegreen Deity, the Dōngdì ( "East Deity") or Dōngyuèdàdì ( "Great Deity of the Eastern Peak"): he is Tàihào , associated with the essence of wood and with Jupiter, and is the god of fertility and spring. The Bluegreen Dragon is both his animal form and constellation. His female consort is the goddess of fertility Bixia.
  Hēidì — Black Deity, the Běidì ( "North Deity") or Běiyuèdàdì ( "Great Deity of the Northern Peak"): he is Zhuānxū, today frequently worshipped as Xuánwǔ ( "Dark Warrior") or Zhēnwǔ, and is associated with the essence of water and winter, and with Mercury. His animal form is the Black Dragon and his stellar animal is the tortoise-snake.
  Chìdì — Red Deity, the Nándì ( "South Deity") or Nányuèdàdì ( "Great Deity of the Southern Peak"): he is Shennong (the "Divine Farmer"), the Yandi ("Fiery Deity"), associated with the essence of fire and summer, and with Mars. His animal form is the Red Dragon and his stellar animal is the phoenix. He is the god of agriculture, animal husbandry, medicinal plants and market.
  Báidì — White Deity, the Xīdì ( "West Deity") or Xīyuèdàdì ( "Great Deity of the Western Peak"): he is Shǎohào, and is the god of the essence of metal and autumn, associated with Venus. His animal form is the White Dragon and his stellar animal the tiger.
  Sānguān or  Sānguāndàdì — Three Officials [of Heaven] or Three Officer Great Deities: Yao  the Official of Heaven (Tiānguān ), Shun  the Official of Earth (Deguān ), and Yu  the Official of Water (Shuǐguān ).

In mythology, Huangdi and Yandi fought a battle against each other; and Huang finally defeated Yan with the help of the Dragon (the controller of water, who is Huangdi himself). This myth symbolises the equipoise of yin and yang, here the fire of knowledge (reason and craft) and earthly stability. Yan  is flame, scorching fire, or an excess of it (it is important to note that graphically it is a double  huo, "fire"). As an excess of fire brings destruction to the earth, it has to be controlled by a ruling principle. Nothing is good in itself, without limits; good outcomes depend on the proportion in the composition of things and their interactions, never on extremes in absolute terms. Huangdi and Yandi are complementary opposites, necessary for the existence of one another, and they are powers that exist together within the human being.

Gods of celestial and terrestrial phenomena

  Lóngshén — Dragon Gods, or  Lóngwáng — Dragon Kings: also Sìhǎi Lóngwáng ( "Dragon Kings of the Four Seas"), are gods of watery sources, usually reduced to four, patrons of the Four Seas (sihai ) and the four cardinal directions. They are the White Dragon ( Báilóng), the Black Dragon ( Xuánlóng), the Red Dragon ( Zhūlóng), and the Bluegreen Dragon ( Qīnglóng). Corresponding with the Five Deities as the chthonic forces that they sublimate (the Dragon Gods are often represented as the "mount" of the Five Deities), they inscribe the land of China into an ideal sacred squared boundary. The fifth dragon, the Yellow Dragon ( Huánglóng), is the dragon of the centre representing the Yellow God.
  Báoshén — Hail God
  Bālà,  Chóngshén — Insect God, or  Chóngwáng — Insect King: the gods of insects
 Dòushén — Smallpox God
  Fēngshén — Wind God, or  Fēi Lián
  Hǎishén — Sea God, or  Hǎiyé — Sea Lord
  Héshén — River God: any watercourse god among which one of the most revered is the god of the Yellow River,  Hébó — River Lord
  Gǔshén — Valley God, in the Daodejing a name used to refer to the Way
  Huǒshén — Fire God, often personified as Zhùróng
  Húshén — Lake God
  Jīnshén — Gold God, often identified as the  Qiūshén — Autumn God, and personified as Rùshōu
  Jǐngshén — Waterspring God
  Léishén — Thunder God, or  Léigōng — Thunder Duke; his consort is  Diànmǔ — Lightning Mother
  Mùshén — Woodland God, usually the same as the  Chūnshén — Spring God, and as Jùmáng
  Shānshén — Mountain God
  Shuǐshén — Water God
  Tǔdìshén — God of the Local Land, or  Tǔshén — Earth God, or  Tǔdìgōng — Duke of the Local Land: the tutelary deity of any locality and their Overlord is  Hòutǔ — Queen of the Earth
  Wēnshén — Plague God
  Xiāngshuǐshén — Xiang Waters' Goddesses, are the patrons of the Xiang River
  Xuěshén — Snow God
  Yǔshén — Rain God
  Xīhé the  Tàiyángshén — Great Sun Goddess, or  Shírìzhīmǔ — Mother of the Ten Suns
  Yuèshén — Moon Goddesses:  Chángxī or  Shí'èryuèzhīmǔ — Mother of the Twelve Moons, and  Cháng'é

Gods of human virtues and crafts

 Civil (wen) and military (wu) deities:
  Wéndi — Culture Deity, or  Wénchāngdì — Deity who Makes Culture Thrive, or  Wénchāngwáng — King who Makes Culture Thrive: in southern provinces this deity takes the identity of different historical persons while in the north he is more frequently the same as Confucius (Kǒngfūzǐ )
  Kuíxīng — Chief Star, another god of culture and literature, but specifically examination, is a personification of the man who awakens to the order of the Great Chariot
  Wǔdì — Military Deity:  Guāndì — Divus Guan, also called  Guāngōng — Duke Guan, and popularly  Guānyǔ Another class is the  Zhànshén — Fight God, who may be personified by Chīyóu or Xíngtiān (who was decapitated for fighting against Tian)
  Bǎoshēngdàdì — Great Deity who Protects Life
  Bāxiān — Eight Immortals
  Cánshén — Silkworm God, who may be:
  Cánmǔ — Silkworm Mother, also called  Cángū — Silkworm Maiden, who is identified as Léizǔ, the wife of the Yellow Emperor: the invention of sericulture is attributed primarily to her
  Qīngyīshén — Bluegreen-Clad God: his name as a human was  Cáncóng — Silkworm Twig, and he is the first ruler and ancestor of the Shu state, and promoter of sericulture among his people
  Cáishén — Wealth God
  Cāngjié, the four-eyed inventor of the Chinese characters
  Chénghuángshén — Moat and Walls God, Boundary God: the god of the sacred boundaries of a human agglomeration, he is often personified by founding fathers or noble personalities from each city or town
  Chénjìnggū — Old Quiet Lady, also called  Línshuǐ Fūrén — Waterside Dame
  Chēshén — Vehicle God
  Èrlángshén — Twice Young God, the god of engineering
  Guǎngzé Zūnwáng — Honorific King of Great Compassion
  Guānyīn — She who Hears the Cries of the World, the goddess of mercy
  Huáng Dàxiān — Great Immortal Huang
  Jìgōng — Help Lord
  Jiǔshén — Wine God, personified as  Yidi  Jiǔtiān Xuánnǚ — Mysterious Lady of the Nine Heavens, a disciple of Xiwangmu and initiator of Huangdi
  Lóngmǔ — Dragon Mother
  Lǔbān, the god of carpentry
  Lùshén — Road God
  Māzǔ — Ancestral Mother, often entitled the Queen of Heaven
  Píng'ānshén — Peace God, an embodiment of whom is considered to have been Mao Zedong
  Qīngshuǐ Zǔshī — Venerable Patriarch of the Clear Stream
  Táoshén — Pottery God
  Tùershén — Leveret God, the god of love among males
  Tuōtǎlǐ Tiānwáng — Tower-Wielding Heavenly King, in person Li Jing, who has three sons, the warlike protector deities Jīnzhā, Mùzhā (木吒) and Nǎzhā
  Wǔxiǎn — Five Shining Ones, possibly a popular form of the cosmological Five Deities
  Xǐshén — Joy God
  Yàoshén — Medicine God, or frequently  Yàowáng — Medicine King"
  Yuèxià Lǎorén — Old Man Under the Moon, the matchmaker who pairs lovers together
  Yùshén — Jail-Purgatory God
  Zàoshén — Hearth God, the master of the household deities including: the Bed God ( Chuángshén), the Gate Gods ( Ménshén) and the Toilet god ( Cèshén), often personified as Zigu
  Sānxīng — Three Stars, a cluster of three astral gods of well-being:
  Fúxīng — Prosperity Star, god of happiness
  Lùxīng — Firmness Star, god of firmness and success in life and examinations
  Shòuxing — Longevity Star, who stands for a healthy and long life

Gods of animal and vegetal life
  Huāshén — Flower Goddess
  Húshén — Fox God(dess), or  Húxiān — Fox Immortal, also called  Húxiān Niángniáng — Fox Immortal Lady
 Two other great fox deities, peculiar to northeast China, are the Great Lord of the Three Foxes ( Húsān Tàiyé) and the Great Lady of the Three Foxes ( Húsān Tàinǎi) representing the yin and yang
  Mǎshén — Horse God, or Mǎwáng  — Horse King
  Niúshén — Cattle God or Ox God, also called  Niúwáng — Cattle King
  Lángshén — Wolf God
  Shùshén — Tree God(s)
  Wǔgǔshén — Five Cereals God, another name of Shennong
  Yuánshén — Monkey God, or  Yuánwáng — Monkey King, who is identified as Sūn Wùkōng
  Zhīmáshén — Sesame God

Bixia mother goddess worship

The worship of mother goddesses for the cultivation of offspring is present all over China, but predominantly in northern provinces. There are nine main goddesses, and all of them tend to be considered as manifestations or attendant forces of a singular goddess identified variously as Bixia Yuanjun  (the Lady of the Blue Dawn, also known as the Tiānxiān Niángniáng , "Heavenly Immortal Lady", or Tàishān Niángniáng , "Lady of Mount Tai", or also Jiǔtiān Shèngmǔ , "Holy Mother of the Nine Skies") or Houtu, the goddess of the earth. Bixia herself is identified by Taoists as the more ancient goddess Xiwangmu, The general Chinese term for "goddess" is  nǚshén, and goddesses may receive many qualifying titles including mǔ ( "mother"), lǎomǔ ( "old mother"), shèngmǔ ( "holy mother"), niángniáng ( "lady"), nǎinai ( "granny").

The additional eight main goddesses of fertility, reproduction and growth are:
  Bānzhěn Niángniáng, the goddess who protects children from illness;
  Cuīshēng Niángniáng, the goddess who gives swift childbirth and protects midwives;
  Nǎimǔ Niángniáng, the goddess who presides over maternal milk and protects nursing;
  Péigū Niángniáng, the goddess who cultivate children;
  Péiyǎng Niángniáng, the goddess who protects the upbringing of children;
  Sòngzi Niángniáng or  Zǐsūn Niángniáng, the goddess who presides over offspring;
  Yǎnguāng Niángniáng, the goddess who protects eyesight;
  Yǐnméng Niángniáng, the goddess who guides young children.

Altars of goddess worship are usually arranged with Bixia at the center and two goddesses at her sides, most frequently the Lady of Eyesight and the Lady of Offspring. A different figure but with the same astral connections as Bixia is the Goddess of the Seven Stars ( Qīxīng Niángniáng). There is also the cluster of the Holy Mothers of the Three Skies ( Sānxiāo Shèngmǔ; or  Sānxiāo Niángniáng, "Ladies of the Three Stars"), composed of Yunxiao Guniang, Qiongxiao Guniang and Bixiao Guniang. The cult of Chenjinggu present in southeast China is identified by some scholars as an emanation of the northern cult of Bixia.

Other goddesses worshipped in China include Cánmǔ ( Silkworm Mother) or Cángū ( Silkworm Maiden), identified with Léizǔ (the wife of the Yellow Emperor), Mágū ( "Hemp Maiden"), Sǎoqīng Niángniáng ( Goddess who Sweeps Clean), Sānzhōu Niángniáng ( Goddess of the Three Isles), and Wusheng Laomu. Mother goddess is central in the theology of many folk religious sects.

Gods of northeast China

Northeast China has clusters of deities which are peculiar to the area, deriving from the Manchu and broader Tungusic substratum of the local population. Animal deities related to shamanic practices are characteristic of the area and reflect wider Chinese cosmology. Besides the aforementioned Fox Gods ( Húxiān), they include:
  Huángxiān — Yellow Immortal, the Weasel God
  Shéxiān — Snake Immortal, also variously called  Liǔxiān — Immortal Liu, or  Chángxiān — Viper Immortal, or also  Mǎngxiān — Python or Boa Immortal
  Báixiān — White Immortal, the Hedgehog God
  Hēixiān — Black Immortal, who may be the  Wūyāxiān — Crow Immortal, or the  Huīxiān — Rat Immortal, with the latter considered a misinterpretation of the former

Gods of Indian origin

Gods who have been adopted into Chinese religion but who have their origins in the Indian subcontinent or Hinduism:
  Guānyīn — "She who Hears the Cries of the World", a Chinese goddess of mercy modeled after the bodhisattva Avalokiteśvara  Sìmiànshén — "Four-Faced God", but also a metaphor for "Ubiquitous God": The recent cult has its origin in the Thai transmission of the Hindu god Brahma, but it is important to note that it is also an epithet of the indigenous Chinese god Huangdi who, as the deity of the centre of the cosmos, is described in the Shizi as "Yellow Emperor with Four Faces" ( Huángdì Sìmiàn).
  Xiàngtóushén — "Elephant-Head God", is the Indian god Ganesha

Gods of northern people
 Genghis Khan ( Chéngjísīhán), worshipped by Mongols and Chinese under a variety of divinity titles including  Shèngwǔ Huángdì — "Holy Military Sovereign Deity",  Fǎtiān Qǐyùn "Starter of the Transmission of the Law of Heaven", and  Tàizǔ — "Great Ancestor" (of the Yuan and the Mongols).

See also
 Chinese folk religion
 Chinese temple 
 Shen
 Xian
 Zhenren

Notes

Notes about the deities and their names

 References 
 Citations 

 Sources 

 
 
 
 
  Volume I: The Ancient Eurasian World and the Celestial Pivot, Volume II: Representations and Identities of High Powers in Neolithic and Bronze China, Volume III: Terrestrial and Celestial Transformations in Zhou and Early-Imperial China''.
 
 
 
 
 
 
  Original preserved at The British Library. Digitalised in 2014.
 
  Two volumes: 1) A-L; 2) L-Z.
 
 
 
 
 

 
 
Lists of deities
Religion-related lists